Willard Blackmer Morrell (April 9, 1893 – August 5, 1975) was a professional baseball player. He was a right-handed pitcher over parts of three seasons (1926, 1930–31) with the Washington Senators and New York Giants. For his career, he compiled an 8-6 record, with a 4.64 earned run average, and 35 strikeouts in 143.2 innings pitched.

An alumnus of the University of Massachusetts Lowell and Tufts University, he was born in Hyde Park, Massachusetts and died in Birmingham, Alabama at the age of 82.

External links

1893 births
1975 deaths
Washington Senators (1901–1960) players
New York Giants (NL) players
Major League Baseball pitchers
Baseball players from Massachusetts
Minor league baseball managers
New Haven Profs players
Birmingham Barons players
Shreveport Sports players
Bridgeport Bears (baseball) players
Indianapolis Indians players
Wilkes-Barre Barons (baseball) players
Buffalo Bisons (minor league) players
Jersey City Skeeters players
Harrisburg Senators players
Albany Senators players
Hutchinson Larks players
Gadsden Pilots players
UMass Lowell River Hawks baseball players
Tufts Jumbos baseball players
Valdosta Trojans players
Cordele Reds players